If You Walk Before You Crawl, You Crawl Before You Die is the third full-length album release by American sludge band Rwake. It was released on July 10, 2004 through At a Loss Records. This album marks the debut of Kiffin on guitars, replacing Chuck Schaaf, who left to form Deadbird.

Track listing

Personnel
Recorded by Sanford Parker at Volume Studios in Chicago
C.T.: (Vocals)
Gravy: (Guitar)
Kiffin: Guitar
Reid: (Bass)
Jeff Morgan (Drums)
[[Brittany: (Moog, Vocals, Samples)

Rwake albums
2004 albums